Smart pill may refer to:

 Capsule endoscopy, use of a pill containing a small camera used to record internal images of the gastrointestinal tract for use in medical diagnosis 
 Digital pill, a pill which contains a drug and an ingestible sensor that transmits medical data 
 Colloquial term for purported nootropic agents